Butterflies is a 2018 Turkish drama film directed by Tolga Karaçelik. It was screened in the World Cinema Dramatic Competition section at the 2018 Sundance Film Festival.

Plot 
Cemal, Kenan and Suzan lost contact with their father Mazhar thirty years ago due to circumstances and each went their separate ways. Unexpectedly, their father contacts them and asks them to come visit him in their native village in the Turkish countryside. Cemal is an astronaut with no experience, Kenan is an unsuccessful voice actor and Suzan is an unstable teacher but Cemal is able to convince his brother and sister to take a long car ride together to their native village.

Cast
 Tolga Tekin as Cemal
 Bartu Küçükçaglayan as Kenan
 Tugce Altug as Suzan
 Serkan Keskin as Muhtar
 Hakan Karsak as Imam
 Ezgi Mola as Sevtap

References

External links
 

2018 films
2018 drama films
Turkish drama films
2010s Turkish-language films